Quad (formerly Quad/Graphics) is an American commercial printing company which offers marketing strategy and management services, based in Sussex, Wisconsin. It was founded as a printing company on July 13, 1971, by Harry V. Quadracci. Since 2014, the company has expanded its marketing services. The company has 50 printing facilities in 14 countries, including in Europe, Canada, India, and Latin America, with the majority in the United States. It prints numerous magazines, including Businessweek, Time, Sports Illustrated, People, and Milwaukee Magazine (a title the company owns and self-publishes).

History

Printing magazines and catalogs 
The company, originally named Quad/Graphics, was founded in 1971 by Harry V. Quadracci as a printer of catalogues and magazines such as Wisconsin-based Investor magazine, Fishing Facts magazine, and others. The company had 20 workers and one press in 1972; this grew to 100 employees and three presses in 1976, and by 1979 it had 300 employees and six presses. At the end of the 1970s, Quad/Graphics won its first major national contract with Newsweek. After that, contracts with Harper's, Time, and US News & World Report followed.

Move to publishing 
In 1983, Quad/Graphics purchased Milwaukee Magazine, and made Betty Quadracci (the wife of Harry V. Quadracci) the president and publisher. By the mid-1990s, the company was printing magazines like People, Sports Illustrated, Playboy, National Geographic, and catalogs for LL Bean and Lands' End; by this time, it had almost 9,000 employees.

Quad began a partnership with Condé Nast in 1993, when it started printing the Architectural Digest. By 2006, Quad was a major print vendor for Condé Nast, and by 2019, Quad was printing all of the publisher's magazines (including Vogue, Brides, and The New Yorker).

In 2002, Tom Quadracci took over as company president after the death of his brother Harry.  Harry's son, Joel Quadracci, took over in 2006 as president.

Acquisitions and IPO 
From 2010 to 2013, Quad engaged in a series of acquisitions, and closed several plants. In July 2010, Quad acquired competitor World Color Press, and in August 2010 announced that it would be closing five plants as part of a consolidation plan related to the acquisition. In November it acquired the HGI Company, a commercial and specialty products printer; this was followed by a July 2011 asset swap with Transcontinental Incorporated, in which Quad acquired Transcontinental's Mexican assets, along with its black-and-white book printing business for U.S. export (in exchange for seven of Quad's Canadian facilities). The former Quebecor World plant in Aurora, Ontario is now a TC Transcontinental facility. On January 16, 2013, Quad acquired Vertis Holdings, Inc., a printer of retail inserts, direct mail and in-store marketing materials.

In 2010, immediately after closing the deal with World Color Press, Quad held an initial public offering and began trading on the New York Stock Exchange.

Expansion to marketing and business services 
In 2014, Quad began to offer marketing services in addition to printing. In early 2015, BlueSoho was established by Quad as an independent marketing services brand. In September 2017, Quad won a $450 million contract to print all of Bluestem Brands' catalogs, and in February 2018 Quad acquired Ivie & Associates LLC, a Dallas-based provider of business services for retailers. In March 2018, Quad increased its equity in the Rise Interactive for $8.7 million, resulting in a majority ownership stake (having owned a non-controlling interest in the company since July 2016).

In November 2018, the company acquired LSC Communications in an all-stock deal for $1.4 billion. Shareholders of both companies approved the merger in February 2019. In June 2019 the U.S. Department of Justice's antitrust division sued to block the acquisition. A trial date was set that meant the earliest the company could expect a decision would have been in 2020, a costly delay which caused the company to call off of the deal. Quad paid LSC a reverse termination fee of $45 million, as required by the merger agreement. Since 2010 the company has closed 47 printing facilities in response to changing media and advertising trends. As of January 2021, Quad had 50 printing plants around the world, including 41 in the US, with three to be closed during 2021.

In November 2018, Quad agreed to purchase Minneapolis-based advertising firm Periscope, Inc., for $132 million, a deal which closed in January 2019. In January 2020, Periscope CEO Elizabeth Ross left, and was replaced by an interim CEO from Quad; in June 2020, Periscope announced Cari Bucci-Hulings would join Periscope as its new president, effective July 6, 2020.

In July 2019, Quad announced it was closing its 220,000-square-foot printing plant in Midland, Michigan, and laying off the plant's 300 employees. In the same year, the company was renamed from Quad/Graphics to Quad.

On July 1, 2020, at least five employees at Periscope walked out in protest against Quad, alleging "interference by its parent company in Periscope’s social media communications about the Black Lives Matter movement and staffer concerns that Quad was releasing deceptive data about its employee diversity." The walk-out was led by a group strategy director at Periscope who, weeks earlier, had started a movement to address the "systemic racism that is afflicting our industry." On July 2, 2020, approximately 150 employees walked out, consisting of nearly the entire agency.

In February 2021, Quad and the Quadracci family's Windhover Foundation committed $1 million to a three-year partnership with The BrandLab, a non-profit organization that supports young people from diverse backgrounds to advance in the marketing industry.

References

External links
Official website
Quad Graphics First Responder shoulder patch
 

Companies listed on the New York Stock Exchange
Manufacturing companies based in Milwaukee
Waukesha County, Wisconsin
Manufacturing companies established in 1971
American companies established in 1971
Printing companies of the United States
1971 establishments in Wisconsin
2010 initial public offerings